Brendon Burchard is a bestselling author from the New York Times. His latest book, High Performance Habits, was a Wall Street Journal bestseller and was nominated by Amazon as one of his top three business and leadership books of 2017 Success Magazine covered Burchard in October 2017 where the article named him the world's highest-paid motivational and marketing trainer. He has authored online personal development courses with the Oprah Winfrey Network. O, The Oprah Magazine, named him "one of the most influential leaders in the field of personal growth." Burchard also hosts a podcast, The Brendon Show.

Career
Burchard cites surviving a car accident at age 19 as the inspiration for his core teaching questions: “Did I live? Did I love? Did I matter?” A video sharing his story has garnered over 27 million views.

Burchard is the founder of the Experts Academy and the High Performance Academy. Both training programs provide students Burchard's lessons in business, entrepreneurship, psychology, productivity, and persuasion.

In 2011, Burchard's second book, The Millionaire Messenger was published and reached #1 on The New York Times best seller list as well as The Wall Street Journal, USA Today, and Amazon.com bestseller lists.

In 2012, The Charge: Activating the 10 Human Drives That Make You Feel Alive reached #1 on The Wall Street Journal bestseller list.

In 2014, The Motivation Manifesto spent 32 weeks on The New York Times best-seller list.

In 2016, Burchard was named a member of Oprah Winfrey Network's Super Soul 100.

In 2017, High Performance Habits became a Wall Street Journal best-seller and was #2 on Amazon's "Best business and leadership books of 2017" list.

Bibliography
 Life's Golden Ticket: An Inspirational Novel (2008) 
 The Millionaire Messenger (2011) 
 The Charge: Activating the 10 Human Drives that Make You Feel Alive (2012) 
 The Motivation Manifesto: 9 Declarations to Claim Your Personal Power (2014)
 High Performance Habits: How Extraordinary People Become That Way (2017)

References

External links
 Official website

Further reading

Cover story, Success Magazine.
O, The Oprah Magazine.

American motivational speakers
American motivational writers
American self-help writers
Life coaches
American Internet celebrities
Living people
1977 births